Amit Tiwari is an Indian actor who predominantly works in Telugu cinema. He is known for his negative roles in Telugu films in addition to a few Tamil,Kannada and Bhojpuri films. Some of his notable roles are in films such as Vikramarkudu (2006), Lakshyam (2007), Rowdy Rathore (2012), Temper (2015). He was a contestant in the second season of the reality Telugu TV show Bigg Boss in 2018, where he finished in the seventh place and was evicted on day 98.

Career 
Amit starred in many films from back in 2004 till date, mostly in villainous roles.

Amit participated in the second season of Bigg Boss, the reality TV show which was hosted by Nani. The show aired on Star Maa. Amit finished in the seventh place.

Filmography 

All films are in Telugu unless mentioned.

References 

Living people
Indian male film actors
Male actors from Hyderabad, India
Male actors in Telugu cinema
Bigg Boss (Telugu TV series) contestants
1986 births
Male actors in Tamil cinema
Male actors in Hindi cinema
Male actors in Malayalam cinema